Ahmet Keloğlu (born 15 January 1962 in Turkey) is a Turkish retired footballer.

References

Turkish footballers
Living people
1962 births
Association football midfielders
Turkey international footballers
ADO Den Haag players
Galatasaray S.K. footballers
Kocaelispor footballers
Karşıyaka S.K. footballers
Konyaspor footballers